
John was Abbot of Vale Royal Abbey, Cheshire, between 1405 and 1411, and although his abbacy seems to have been largely free of the local disorder that had plagued those of his predecessors, the Abbey appears to have been taken in to King Henry IV's hands on at least two occasions (in 1405 and 1408).

Notes

References

Bibliography
 
 
 
 
 

13th-century English people
Abbots of Vale Royal Abbey